Ramiro González may refer to:

 Ramiro González (footballer, born 1980), Argentinean footballer
 Ramiro González (footballer, born 1990), Argentine-Chilean footballer
 Ramiro González (politician) (born 1962), Spanish politician